María Isabel Preysler Arrastía (born February 18, 1951) is a Spanish-Filipina socialite and television host. She is the mother of singers Enrique Iglesias, Julio Iglesias Jr., journalist Chábeli Iglesias, Tamara Falcó y Preysler, 6th Marchioness of Griñón, and Ana Boyer Preysler.

Early life
Preysler was born in Manila, Philippines, the third of six children to a wealthy family. She attended a private Roman Catholic school; Her father, Carlos Preysler y Pérez de Tagle, was the executive director of Philippine Airlines and one of the board of directors of the Banco Español de Manila (Spanish Bank of Manila), while her mother, María Beatriz Arrastía y Reinares, was the owner of a real estate company in Manila. She is the niece of actress Neile Adams, who is her mother's half-sister. She is also the first cousin once removed of American actor Steven R. McQueen, who is Neile's grandson.

Career
During her youth, Preysler was a model who participated in beauty pageants and charity events for the Sheraton Hotels and Resorts in Manila and went on to win titles in several events. At the age of 16, she immigrated to Madrid, Spain to live with her uncle and aunt and to study at Mary Ward College, an Irish Catholic University in Spain, where she studied accounting.

Preysler began working as a journalist for Spanish celebrity-news magazine ¡Hola! in 1970, and her first interviewee was her future husband Julio Iglesias. In 1984, she hosted a Spanish lifestyle television programme, Hoy en Casa, and has hosted and appeared in various programs since. In May 2001, she was Prince Charles' guest of honour for the opening of his Spanish Garden at the Chelsea Flower Show in England. She was his guest of honor again in 2005 at a garden party during a holiday to Spain by the Royal Crown. In 2004, Preysler became Spain's welcoming host for David and Victoria Beckham when she hosted a welcoming party at her house for the celebrity couple. She became close friends with Victoria and was often photographed shopping with her during their stay in Madrid.

Preysler continues to be the national spokesmodel for Ferrero Rocher, Suárez jewelry, Manolo Blahnik shoes, Chrysler cars and Porcelanosa tiles, for which American Hollywood actor George Clooney recently worked with her in 2006 to represent the brand in an advertising campaign.

Readers at ¡Hola! magazine voted Preysler as the most elegant and best-dressed woman in Spain for 1991, 2002, 2006 and 2007.

In 2006, Preysler was also honored along with Hillary Clinton, Shakira and Yoko Ono among others with the Women Together Award, which honors women for their philanthropical contributions to the United Nations in New York, making her the first woman of Filipino descent in history to win the award.

In 2007, she and her daughters were invited by Prince Charles to be guests of honour at his London home, Clarence House.

Personal life
In 1970, Preysler was introduced to a retired footballer named Julio Iglesias, who had just signed a recording contract to become a singer. Iglesias invited her to watch a  concert. The couple was married seven months later on January 29, 1971, in Illescas, in a religious ceremony. They were married for seven years and the couple had three children, María Isabel (b. 1971), Julio José (b. 1973) and Enrique Miguel (b. 1975). They divorced in 1979. After they had divorced and moved on, in 1982 she sent her children away to Miami to live with their father because of kidnapping threats she was receiving.

Preysler married Carlos Falcó, 5th Marquess of Griñón on March 23, 1980. The couple had one daughter, Tamara Isabel Falcó (b. 1981). They divorced in 1985.

Her third marriage, in 1987, was to the former Spanish finance minister Miguel Boyer (died September 29, 2014). The couple had one daughter, Ana Isabel Boyer (b. 1989).

From 2015 to 2022, she was in a relationship with Peruvian Nobel laureate writer, journalist and politician Mario Vargas Llosa.

In 1987, her two sisters immigrated to Spain with their families to be closer to Isabel. She holds dual citizenship in both the Philippines and Spain.

Her father, Carlos Preysler, is deceased; her mother, Beatriz Preysler, lives in Madrid with Isabel, her daughter Tamara Isabel (since her father's death in 2020, Marquesa de Griñón), and Mario Vargas Llosa.

Titles 
 1980–1987: The Most Excellent The Marchioness of Griñón

References

External links
 

1951 births
Living people
Filipino expatriates in Spain
Filipino female models
Filipino journalists
Filipino people of American descent
Filipino people of Kapampangan descent
Filipino philanthropists
Filipino Roman Catholics
Filipino socialites
Filipino women journalists
Iglesias family
People from Manila
Spanish female models
Spanish people of American descent
Spanish people of Filipino descent
Spanish philanthropists
Spanish socialites